Toivo Reingoldt (15 March 1906 – 28 September 1941) was a Finnish swimmer who won a European title in the 200 m breaststroke in 1931. He competed in this event at the 1932 Summer Olympics, but failed to reach the final. He was killed in action during World War II.

References

1906 births
1941 deaths
Finnish male breaststroke swimmers
Olympic swimmers of Finland
Swimmers at the 1932 Summer Olympics
European Aquatics Championships medalists in swimming
Finnish military personnel killed in World War II
People from Kotka
Sportspeople from Kymenlaakso